Charlton cemetery is a cemetery, opened in 1855, covering 15 acres of ground in Charlton, south-east London. Situated in Cemetery Lane to the east of Charlton Park, the cemetery has retained its Victorian layout, and features two 19th-century chapels and numerous military graves.

It was originally created as a "Gentleman's Cemetery" by Charlton Burial Board on eight acres of land that were formerly part of the estate of Sir Thomas Maryon Wilson. A further seven acres was added in the 20th century. The two chapels are both 19th-century: the Church of England chapel is Early English style and has a stained glass west window (showing the Entombment) presented in 1865 by the local vicar; the Roman Catholic Chapel is in Decorated style.

Graves

The graves and memorials include:
 Peter Barlow (1776–1862) – mathematician
 William Henry Barlow (1812–1902) – civil engineer (and son of Peter Barlow)
 Sir Geoffrey Callender (1875–1946) – the first director of the National Maritime Museum
 George Cooper (1844–1909) – London politician, Member of Parliament for Bermondsey
 William Clark Cowie (1849–1910) – Scottish engineer, mariner, and businessman, and administrator of Borneo
 Sir William Cunningham Dalyell of the Binns, 7th Baronet (1784–1865) – who fought in the Napoleonic Wars
 Lt-Gen Sir William Dobbie (1879–1964) – veteran of the Second Boer War, and First and Second World Wars, and Governor of Malta
 Frederick Hobson Leslie (1855–1892) – actor and comedian, best known for using the pseudonym "A. C. Torr"
 Jeffery Allen Marston (1831–1911) CB, Hon FRCS – Principal Medical Officer to the Indian Army, honorary surgeon to Queen Victoria and King Edward VII
 Thomas Murphy (d 1932) – former owner of Charlton greyhound track (his memorial features two sleeping greyhounds)
 General Sir Charles Edward Nairne (1836–1899) – Commander-in-Chief, India.
 Admiral Sir Watkin Owen Pell (1788–1869) – served on a number of ships 1799 to 1841, superintendent of several dockyards 1841 to 1845, and commissioner of Greenwich Hospital
 Admiral George Perceval, 6th Earl of Egmont (1794–1874) – a midshipman at the Battle of Trafalgar at age 11
 Helen Margaret Spanton (1877–1934) – artist and suffragette
 William Silas Spanton (1845–1930) – artist and photographer
 Sir John Maryon Wilson (1802–1876) – brother of Sir Thomas Maryon Wilson; involved in the preservation of Hampstead Heath
 Rachel O. Wingate (1901–1953) – linguist and missionary. The cemetery also contains a memorial to her brother Major General Orde Wingate (1903–1944) – head of the 'Chindits' in Burma – who is buried at Arlington National Cemetery, United States

The cemetery also contains the marked graves of 56 Commonwealth service personnel from the First World War (plus a memorial to two sailors and two soldiers in unmarked graves), and a further 55 from the Second World War. A War Cross faces the entrance to the cemetery.

References

External links
 

Cemeteries in London
1855 establishments in England
Parks and open spaces in the Royal Borough of Greenwich
Commonwealth War Graves Commission cemeteries in England